"Ladies' Night" is a song by American band Kool & the Gang, released as the first single from their eleventh album of the same name (1979). It is a play on the popular use of "Ladies Nights" at bars and clubs that were meant to draw in more female patrons in order to draw in even more male clientele. The song as a single was a success, and became a radio staple. It was also a chart success, peaking at number eight on the US Billboard Hot 100 in 1980 and stayed atop the R&B charts for two weeks. It also gave them their first hit in the United Kingdom in August 1979, peaking at number nine in the UK Singles Chart.

Record World called it a "startling shot of funky motion music."

Track listing

Notes
 denotes associate producer

Charts

Weekly charts

Year-end charts

Certifications

Atomic Kitten version

In 2003, Kool & the Gang asked English girl group Atomic Kitten to re-record "Ladies Night" for their The Hits: Reloaded tribute album. The band subsequently asked them if they could include it on their then-untitled third album which they eventually named after the song in honour of the collaboration following Kool's approval. The re-recording was produced by Khalis Bayyana and Leigh Guest; Andy Whitmore is credited as a co-producer, while Ash Howes and Martin Harrington served as additional producers. "Ladies Night" was released as the lead single from The Hits: Reloaded and served as the second single from Atomic Kitten's Ladies Night album. The song peaked at number three in Spain, and reached number eight on the UK Singles Chart, outperforming the original version of the track.

Chart performance
The song debuted at its peak at number 8 on the UK Singles Chart, becoming Atomic Kitten's first single to not reach the top 5 in over two years. It stayed in the top 40 for eight weeks, three of which were in the top ten. In 2021, the Official Charts Company ranked the song as the band's eight seventh-selling single in the United Kingdom – ahead of previous single "If You Come to Me," making it the biggest-selling single from Ladies Night.

In Spain, "Ladies Night" was Atomic Kitten's only top ten hit peaking at number three; it lasted three weeks in the top ten of the Spanish Singles Chart. The song reached the top twenty in the Republic of Ireland, the Netherlands, Flanders and Denmark, and became a top-40 hit in German-speaking Europe, peaking at number 33 in Germany, number 32 in Austria and number 38 in Switzerland. In Oceania, the song did not do as well as their previous singles. "Ladies Night" was not released in New Zealand, where their previous single "If You Come to Me" had reached the top 10, and it managed to peak at only number 39 in Australia, becoming their last single to reach the top 50 there.

Music video
A music video for "Ladies Night" was directed by Cameron Casey. The video begins with many people anxiously crowded around the entrance of a club, trying to get in. Suddenly a pink plasma waves sweeps through the middle of the crowd, from the door, pushing them off to either side. The group head into the Kitten Club, and the crowd follows them in, until only the bouncer is left standing outside. In the well-lit club, the group groove about and sing, a great deal of which is on a pure white discothèque dance floor. They primarily dance in a row, with two rows of men behind them, though occasionally they are straddling the fellows, or performing other dance moves with them.

Drag queens are spotted in the video, and appear repeatedly, including in the women's washroom, near the video's conclusion. A bartender, bearing resemblance to Boy George, appears throughout the video. Jenny Frost starts to flirt with him, as if going in for a kiss; in actuality, she is stealing his drink from behind him. While a man hits on Liz McClarnon, he is in turn hit on by another man. The group repeatedly flip their hands in the air, creating pink plasma as appeared earlier in the video. This transports them to the opposite side of the club, where they appear on rollerskates, in different outfits. They use their magic again, instantly stripping three men down to pink lycra underwear. The men, in their skivvies, visit the girls at their booth. Natasha Hamilton is so amused at the provided crotch view that she brings out American money which she waves around; money is never actually transferred. At the very start of the video, when Frost blows a kiss, lip marks appear on the screen as a graphic.

Track listings

Notes
 denotes co-producer
 denotes additional producer
 denotes vocal producer

Credits and personnel
Credits adapted from the liner notes of Ladies Night.

Studio
 Recorded at KFTA Studios, New Jersey; Metropolis Studios, London; Unique Corp Studios, London

Personnel

 Clifford Adams – trumpet, trombone
 Kaylis Bayyan – producer, saxophone, keyboards
 Ronald Bell – bass guitar, writer
 George "Funky" Brown – keyboard
 Reece Gilmore – programming
 Leigh Guest – arranger, producer, programming
 Martin Harrington – additional producer
 Tim Horton – drums
 Ash Howes – additional producer 

 James Loughrey – U production engineer
 Sennie "Skip" Martin – trumpet, vocals
 Andrew Smith – additional guitars
 Charles Smith – guitars
 James "J.T." Taylor – vocals
 Dennis "D. T." Thomas – guitars
 Keith Uddin – engineer
 Andy Whitmore – co-producer, programming, additional keyboards

Charts

Weekly charts

Year-end charts

Release history

Other covers
 "Ladies Night" was remade with Spanner Banner and Sean Paul in 2004. This song was a collaboration with Kool & the Gang and reached 58 in the Swedish chart 
 One Way, also known as Al Hudson and (soul) partners, did as similar groove on the 1979 hit "You Can Do It"
 Leon Haywood's 1980 song "Don't Push It Don't Force It" has a similar groove.
 San Francisco indie rock band Two Seconds performs the song at their live shows.
 Rapper Lil' Kim used a sample of this song for the remix of her song "Not Tonight", also called "Not Tonight (Ladies' Night Remix)", which features Angie Martinez, Da Brat, Lisa "Left Eye" Lopes, and Missy Elliott.
 Samantha Mumba sings a portion of the song in "Baby, Come Over (This Is Our Night)".
 C+C Music Factory sampled the end of the song in the song "I Found Love" from the album Anything Goes!.
 Preston Reed did a blues rock instrumental cover
 South Korean-Chinese Girl Group Miss A sampled a portion of the song in "Come on Over" on Hush.
 The song is heard and "rabbidizied" by the rabbids for Rayman Raving Rabbids TV Party.
 On the game show Deal or No Deal, episode "Ladies Night & Hot Dog on a Stick", the song is heard when the firefighters are holding the cases.

Movies
 In the 1998 film The Wedding Singer, the character played by Jon Lovitz performs the song in his audition.
 In the 2000 film Little Nicky, the peeper (again played by Lovitz) sings the song while looking at a woman undress. Later, when he is sent to Hell, the song plays while a bird rapes him.
 In the 2002 film Sorority Boys, the song is played when the three main characters Adam, Dave, and Doofer go to a party in drag at their former fraternity house.

References

External links
 Official Kool & the Gang site
 Official Atomic Kitten site

1979 songs
1979 singles
2003 singles
Disco songs
Atomic Kitten songs
Songs written by Rod Temperton
Songs written by James "J.T." Taylor
Songs written by Ronald Bell (musician)
De-Lite Records singles
EMI Records singles
Songs written by Claydes Charles Smith
Songs written by Robert "Kool" Bell
Songs about parties
Songs about dancing